The Syro-Malabar Catholic Archeparchy of Thalassery (anglicised - Tellicherry) is an archeparchy of the Syro-Malabar Church in communion with the See of Rome. The boundaries of the Thalassery ecclesiastical province were extended to include Mangalore, Chickmangalore, Mysore, Shimoga and Ootty as there were settlers in the neighbouring States. The diocese covers an area of  18,000 km² and a Catholic population of 273,826. Since 2022, Joseph Pamplany is the Metropolitan Archbishop.

The ecclesiastical province came into existence on 31 December 1953 through the Papal bull Ad Christi Ecclesiam Regendam issued by Pope Pius XII. The boundaries of the new diocese were the same as those of the Latin Diocese of Calicut. But later, as Catholics of Syro-Malabar Church migrated even to the states of Karnataka and Tamil Nadu, the boundaries were extended to the present Latin Diocese of Mangalore, Chickmangalur, Mysore, Shimoga, and Ootacamund by a decree of the Holy See dated April 29, 1955.

Malabar Migration 
The history of the Malabar Migration and that of the ecclesiastical province of Thalassery are closely connected. The Thalassery diocese took up the struggle of the settlers, who were mostly Syriac Rite Catholics not accustomed to Roman Rite ceremonies. Petitions were sent to the Holy See by the bishops of the settlers, who had migrated to the British Malabar since 1930, requesting for a diocese of their own. Cardinal Tisserant, the Prefect of the Oriental Congregation came to Malabar and personally saw the pitiable situation of the settlers. With the help of locals and priests, they started to make changes in the region.

Suffagran eparchies
 Source: GCatholic
 Eparchy of Bhadravathi
 Eparchy of Mandya
 Eparchy of Mananthavady
 Eparchy of Thamarassery

Saints and causes for canonisation
 Armond Madhavath

See also

References

External links
 Archdiocese of Thalassery website
 Archdiocese of Thalassery -- Information & Photographs
 
 Vimal Jyothi Engineering College, Chemperi
 Vimal Jyothi Institute of Management and Research, Chemperi
 Archeparchial curia  Archdiocese of Tellichery
 History  Archdiocese of Tellichery

Thalassery
Thalassery
Thalassery
Christian organizations established in 1953
Dioceses in Kerala
Churches in Kannur district